Whitney House or Whitney Mansion may refer to:

in the United States (by state then city)
Whitney Section House, Wasilla, Alaska, listed on the NRHP in Matanuska-Susitna Borough, Alaska
J. T. Whitney Funeral Home, Phoenix, Arizona, listed on the NRHP in Phoenix, Arizona 
Grant Whitney House, Payette, Idaho, listed on the NRHP in Payette County, Idaho
Stapleford-Hoover-Whitney House, Vermont, Illinois, listed on the NRHP in Fulton County, Illinois
Col. Nathan Whitney House, Franklin Grove, Illinois, listed on the NRHP in Lee County, Illinois  
William Whitney House, Hinsdale, Illinois, listed on the NRHP in DuPage County, Illinois 
Whitney Ranch Historic District, Hymer, Kansas, listed on the NRHP in Chase County, Kansas  
Andrew M. Whitney House and Barn, Scottsville, Kentucky, listed on the NRHP in Allen County, Kentucky  
Whitney Plantation Historic District, Wallace, Louisiana, listed on the NRHP in St. John the Baptist Parish, Louisiana  
Capt. Joel Whitney House, Phillips, Maine, listed on the NRHP in Franklin County, Maine
Israel Whitney House, Needham, Massachusetts, listed on the NRHP in Massachusetts 
Walcott-Whitney House, Stow, Massachusetts, listed on the NRHP in Massachusetts
Whitney-Farrington-Cook House, Waltham, Massachusetts, listed on the NRHP in Massachusetts
David Whitney House, Detroit, Michigan, listed on the NRHP in Michigan
 Hale-Whitney Mansion, Bayonne, New Jersey, listed on the NRHP in Hudson County, New Jersey
Whitney Mansion (Glassboro, New Jersey), listed on the National Register of Historic Places in Gloucester County, New Jersey
Whitney Mansion (Loudonville, New York), listed on the NRHP in Albany County, New York
Whitney Mansion (Niagara Falls, New York), listed on the National Register of Historic Places in Niagara County, New York
George W. Whitney House, Berea, Ohio, listed on the NRHP in Cuyahoga County, Ohio
Mary Whitney House, Spearfish, South Dakota, listed on the NRHP in Lawrence County, South Dakota
James F. & Mary Jane Whitney House, Mendon, Utah, listed on the NRHP in Cache County, Utah